Knierim may refer to:

People
 Chris Knierim, American figure skater
 Alexa Scimeca Knierim, American figure skater

Places
 Knierim, Iowa